The 1994 UCI Track Cycling World Championships were the World Championship for track cycling. They took place in Palermo, Italy in August 1994. Eleven events were contested, eight for men and three for women.

Medal summary

Medal table

See also
 1994 UCI Road World Championships

References

Uci Track Cycling World Championships, 1994
Track cycling
UCI Track Cycling World Championships by year
International cycle races hosted by Italy
Sport in Palermo
August 1994 sports events in Europe